Josh Gibcus (born 4 April 2003) is an Australian rules footballer who plays for the Richmond Football Club in the Australian Football League (AFL).

Gibcus was drafted by Richmond with the 9th selection in the 2021 AFL draft. He made his AFL debut in the opening round of the 2022 AFL season.

Statistics
Updated to the end of round 23, 2022.

|-
| 2022
|  || 28 || 17 || 3 || 1 || 97 || 60 || 157 || 62 || 21 || 0.2 || 0.1 || 5.7 || 3.5 || 9.2 || 3.6 || 1.2
|- class="sortbottom" 
! colspan=3| Career
! 17
! 3
! 1
! 97
! 60
! 157
! 62
! 21
! 0.2
! 0.1
! 5.7
! 3.5
! 9.2
! 3.6
! 1.2
|}

References

External links

Living people
2003 births
Richmond Football Club players
Greater Western Victoria Rebels players
Australian rules footballers from Victoria (Australia)